Trinity Methodist Episcopal Church may refer to:
 Trinity Methodist Episcopal Church (New Britain, Connecticut)
 Trinity Methodist Episcopal Church (Bridgeville, Delaware)
 Trinity United Methodist Church (Des Moines, Iowa), formerly Trinity Methodist Episcopal Church
 Trinity Methodist Episcopal Church and Rectory (Poughkeepsie, New York)
 Trinity Methodist Episcopal Church (Orangeburg, South Carolina)
 Trinity Methodist Episcopal Church (Chattanooga, Tennessee)
 Trinity Methodist Episcopal Church (Knoxville, Tennessee)
 Trinity Methodist Episcopal Church, a church in the Carolina Heights Historic District of Wilmington, North Carolina

See also
 Trinity Church (disambiguation)
 Trinity Episcopal Church (disambiguation)
 Trinity Methodist Church (disambiguation)